Ayds (pronounced as "aids") Reducing Plan Candy is a discontinued appetite-suppressant candy that enjoyed strong sales in the 1970s and early 1980s and was originally manufactured by The Carlay Company.

Flavors
Ayds was available in chocolate, chocolate mint, butterscotch, and caramel flavors, and later a peanut butter flavor was introduced. The original packaging used the phrase "Ayds Reducing Plan vitamin and mineral Candy"; a later version used the phrase "appetite suppressant candy". The active ingredient was originally benzocaine, presumably to reduce the sense of taste to reduce eating, later changed in the candy (as reported by The New York Times) to phenylpropanolamine.

Relations with AIDS
By the mid-1980s, public awareness of the disease AIDS brought notoriety to the brand due to the phonetic similarity of names and the fact that the disease caused immense weight loss in patients. Initially sales were not negatively affected; in a September 1985 interview, the president of the company that manufactured it stated that in fact, sales had increased as a result of this connection. Early in 1986, another executive of the manufacturer was quoted, "The product has been around for 45 years. Let the disease change its name."

In 1988, by which time the product and its name had been sold to the Dep Corporation, company leadership announced that the company was seeking a new name because sales had dropped as much as 50% due to publicity about the disease. The name Aydslim was tested in Britain during 1988, and ultimately the name of the product was changed in the United States in approximately January 1989 to Diet Ayds. Advertisements for Diet Ayds could be found in newspapers until at least 1993. The product has since been withdrawn from the market.

History
The product was introduced by the Carlay Company of Chicago. A U.S. trademark was registered in 1946 claiming first use in commerce was in 1937.

In 1944, the U.S. Federal Trade Commission objected to the claim that the product could cause the user to "lose up to 10 pounds in 5 days, without dieting or exercising".

The Carlay Company later became a division of Campana Corporation of Batavia, Illinois. Then Campana bought Allied Laboratories of Kansas City in 1956. Thereafter, Campana was bought by Dow Chemical and its president, Irving Willard Crull, was president of Dow for less than six months, during which time he engineered the sale of Campana to Purex in the 1960s. He again became president of Campana while serving as a vice president of Purex, which allowed Campana to function as a separate division. Crull also relied on socialite and Hollywood friends like Bob Hope and his wife Dolores Hope, Tyrone Power and his wife Linda Christian, and others to promote the Ayds Reducing Plan Candy line. A Cosmopolitan magazine article in November 1956 reported that Crull had already recruited a number of his friends amongst socialite and Hollywood celebrities to promote the Ayds Reducing Plan weight-loss regimen.

In 1981, Purex sold the rights to the Ayds name to Jeffrey Martin Inc. In 1987, Jeffrey Martin, Inc. and its product line (including Ayds Appetite Suppressant and Compoz Sleep Aid) were acquired by the Dep Corporation (sometimes written DEP).

References

External links 
 Time magazine: Ayds, Not AIDS (June 1983)
  Ayds Weight-Loss Candy, Status: Real – Museum of Hoaxes
 Photo

Brand name confectionery
Brand name diet products
Products introduced in 1937
Mass media portrayals of HIV/AIDS